Óscar Pulido (1906–1974) was a Mexican actor who acted in over 100 Mexican films.

Selected filmography
The Unknown Policeman (1941)
 A Day with the Devil (1945)
 Rough But Respectable (1949)
 Autumn and Spring (1949)
 The Magician (1949)
 Love for Love (1950)
 The Doorman (1950)
 A Gringo Girl in Mexico (1951) 
 Serenade in Acapulco (1951)
 Kill Me Because I'm Dying! (1951)
 Love for Sale (1951)
 Barefoot Sultan (1956)
Golden Legs (1958)
 A Thousand and One Nights (1958)
 Three Black Angels (1960)
 Chucho el Roto (1960)

External links

Mexican male film actors
Male actors from Mexico City
1906 births
1974 deaths
20th-century Mexican male actors